Maga Dam is a dam located south of Lake Chad near the border of Chad and Cameroon.

History
It was constructed in 1979. In 1994 a pilot program was started to drain some water back into the floodplain. The outcome of the dam diverting vast amounts of water has negatively impacted communities downstream.  Maga Dam is the subject of ongoing environmental studies which implicate the diversion of water, which served as natural inflow to downstream regions, as the primary cause of Lake Chad shrinkage.

External links 
 Safety Assessment of Maga Dam, Cameroon
 www.iwlearn.net
 On Google Maps

Dams in Cameroon
Geography of Cameroon
Dams completed in 1979